The Rupununi Uprising was a secessionist insurrection in Guyana that began on 2 January 1969. Occurring less than two years after Guyana’s independence from the United Kingdom, it constituted the country’s earliest and most severe test of statehood and social solidarity. The uprising was ultimately dispersed by the Guyana Defence Force.

Background 
Valerie Hart, a United Force politician, owned a ranch at Moreru. She was present at the First Conference of Amerindians Leaders, named the "Cabacaburi Congress" in 1968. The Conference presented demands to Prime Minister Forbes Burnham who represented the community of around 40,000 indigenous people of the Rupununi district. The movement defended the integration of natives to Guyanese society, inconsonant with Burnham's afrocentrist policies.

Factions within the indigenous society in South Esequibo felt threatened by the possible distribution of agricultural parcels among the sectors that had supported the Minister, which caused some of the inhabitants to rebel. According to Hart, the region's population rebelled against the government because their constitutional rights were not respected and because of continuous intimidation and repression directed against them.

Guyanese Agriculture Minister, Robert Jordan, declared that the government would not recognize the inhabitants' land ownership certifications and warned that the zone would be occupied by the African American population. Afterwards these declarations, Valerie Hart was appointed as president of the Provisional Government Committee of Rupununi.

Events

Preparation 
At a 23 December 1968 meeting, rebels finalized plans of a separated Rupununi state. Some scholars, including Harold Eugene Davis and Pedro González, have argued that Venezuela supported and sponsored the Rupununi rebels and their secession movement. In an effort to receive support from Venezuela, Hart and her rebels stated that they would grant Venezuela control of Guyana's disputed Guayana Esequiba territory in exchange for assistance.

Attack 
Rebels began their attacks on Lethem in the morning of 2 January 1969, killing five police officers and two civilians while also destroying buildings belonging to the Guyanese government with bazooka fire. The rebels locked citizens in their homes and blocked airfields in Lethem, Annai Good Hope, Karanambo and Karasabai, attempting to block staging areas for Guyanese troops.

Counterattack 
News about the insurrection reached Georgetown by midday prompting the deployment of policemen and soldiers of the Guyana Defence Force (GDF). As troops approached, the rebels quickly fled and the uprising ended. About thirty of the rebels were arrested following the uprising.

The following day, on 4 January, captain Edgar Gavidia Valero flew to Santa Elena de Uairén sent by the Venezuelan government with the orders that the Venezuelan military institutions had to unblock the airfields and start the evacuation of both the Amerindian population and the uprising leaders. Hours afterwards, Guyanese soldiers arrived at the area. Members of the failed uprising fled to Venezuela for protection after their plans unravelled, with Hart and her rebels being granted Venezuelan citizenship by birth since they were recognized as being born in the Guayana Esequiba disputed territory.

Indigenous groups denounced that Guyanese forces had attacked and killed Amerindians in the region. A pilot of the Guaica airline, who stayed at Lettem, described that after two C-47 planes landed, Guyanese forces burned houses, tortured inhabitants and raped women. Opposition leader Cheddi Jagan attempted to send two of his Amerindian personnel to the region in order to observe possible atrocities, but they were held at the airfield Lethem by GDF troops and flown back to Georgetown. Bishop of Georgetown R. Lester Guilly traveled to the area and stated witnessing no atrocities.

Aftermath 
That same night, Valerie Hart fled with her family to Ciudad Bolívar, before going to Caracas to request military aid from the Venezuelan government; according to her, her goal was, on behalf of the rebels, to create an independent region of Guyana. The day after the uprising, on the afternoon of 3 January 1969, Hart met in Caracas with the Venezuelan Foreign Affairs Minister  at the Yellow House, the headquarters of the Ministry of Foreign Affairs. Hart explained the uprising to Iribarren Borges, citing Burnham's policies as its motives, and said that the rebels had the intention of turning the Rupununi into an independent territory under Venezuelan protection. Iribarren Borges replied that Venezuela was bound to the 1966 Geneva Agreement with the United Kingdom and Guyana, and that Venezuela could not intervene in favor of the rebels even if it wanted to.

Minutes after, questioned by journalists after leaving his office, the Minister declared that "Venezuela is not considering aiding the Guyana rebels". Interior Affairs Minister Reinaldo Leandro Mora declared that "the movement would not have failed if Venezuela had intervened". In a press conference nearby, in the Antímano Lounge of El Conde hotel, Valerie Hart declared indignate that: "I want it to be well understood that if the Venezuelan government, by pressure of the United States, does not lend any help to the Rupununi people, it would be equal to support the Burnham government".

After the uprising, Venezuela President Rafael Caldera and Burnham were alarmed at the uprising and vowed to focus their attentions on the issue of the territorial dispute between their two countries.

References 

Conflicts in 1969
History of Venezuela
Wars involving Guyana
1969 in Guyana